Hockey at the 2002 Winter Olympics was held at the E Center in West Valley City and Peaks Ice Arena in Provo, Utah. The men's and women's tournaments were won by Canada, who defeated the host United States in both finals.

Medal summary

Medal table

Medalists

Men's tournament

Qualifying

The final standings at the end of the 1999 IIHF World Championship were used to determine the path to the Olympic tournament.  The top six places were given direct entry to the first round, places seven and eight were given direct entry to the preliminary round, and all other participants were seeded in qualifying tournaments to fill the remaining six spots.  This chart shows the seeding path for all nations, in detail.

Final rankings

 These standings are presented as the IIHF has them, however both the NHL an IOC maintain that all quarterfinal losers are ranked equal at 5th.LA84 foundation Ice Hockey Men Official Report of the XIX Olympic Winter Games p.323

Women's tournament

Qualification 

The qualification process, and seedings for the Olympic tournament, came from the final standings of the 2000 IIHF Women's World Championship.  The top six nations were given direct entry to the Olympics, the final two spots were contested in a qualification tournament.  The nations ranked seven through ten played a round robin in Engelberg Switzerland February 8–11, 2001.

Format 
The eight teams were split into two equal divisions. All teams played three preliminary games within their division. Following the completion of the preliminary round, the top two teams from each division advanced to the medal round and competed in a playoff to determine the gold medalist. The other four played classification games. Team rosters were allowed to have between 15 and 18 skaters (forwards and defensemen).

Participating nations 
A total of eight national teams competed in the women's ice hockey tournament.

See also
Ice sledge hockey at the 2002 Winter Paralympics

References

External links

Official results for men's tournament 
Official results for women's tournament 
Official results for women's qualification 
Official structure and seeding for men's qualification and Olympic tournament 

 
2002 Winter Olympics events
2002
Olympics, Winter
2002
Oly